Provincial Road may refer to:
Provincial road (Italy), a class of road in Italy
Provincial road (Turkey), a class of road in Turkey
Essex County Road 46 in Ontario, Canada, known as Provincial Road for part of its length

See also